Unconditional is a 2012  biographical drama film written and directed by Brent McCorkle, inspired by true events.  It is the first film by Harbinger Media Partners, which aims to "produce high quality theatrical films that honor God and inspire viewers to pursue Him and serve others."  The producers of the film have partnered with a number of charitable and non-profit organizations to encourage moviegoers to meet the needs of others in their communities.

The film is based on the actual story of Joe Bradford, who grew up in a rural area of Tennessee.  When he developed kidney disease, Joe and his wife Denise were forced to move to a low-income area of Nashville.  When they arrived, they were confronted by the needs of the underprivileged children in their neighborhood.  Joe and Denise began to reach out to them and also started directing a choir of inner-city children.  Many of the fatherless children embraced Joe, who became known as "Papa Joe."  Together with his wife, he founded Elijah's Heart, a non-profit organization, in 2005 to help children in need.

The film is the first feature-length project directed by Brent McCorkle, who also wrote the screenplay and edited the film.  He previously worked on several short films, including The Rift, which won an award in the 2009 Doorpost Film Project.

Plot 
Samantha Crawford lives a dream life. She is happily married on a ranch where she keeps her beloved horse, and the stories she's told and illustrated since childhood have become published books.

When her husband Billy is tragically killed, Sam loses her faith and will to live. A death-defying encounter with two children leads to a reunion with Joe, her oldest friend. As Sam watches "Papa" Joe care for and love the kids in his under-resourced neighborhood, she begins to believe that the love of God is always reaching out to her.

Cast 
Lynn Collins as Samantha Crawford
Michael Ealy as "Papa Joe" Bradford
Bruce McGill as Detective Miller
Kwesi Boakye as Macon
Montrel Miller as Grady

Release 
The film was released to theaters on September 21, 2012. Released on DVD March 5, 2013.

Critical reception 
Unconditional received 75% positive reviews from film critics on the aggregate site Rotten Tomatoes. David Martindale gave the film a B+ on Dallas Morning News, introducing it as "a little movie with a big heart, a message film that doesn't taste like medicine." He said, "Unconditional has a lot going for it. In addition to a solid cast, headed by Lynn Collins (John Carter) as Sam and Michael Ealy (Think Like a Man) as Joe, it has an elegant script and striking visuals." Gary Goldstein of the Los Angeles Times was not as favorable in his review, saying that the film included too many cliches and that director Brent McCorkle needed to have "a bit more, er, faith in his audience."

Among film critics at faith-based outlets, Russ Breimeier of Christianity Today said, "Unconditional sets itself apart with quality filmmaking and redemptive storytelling delivered with authenticity." Ted Baehr of Movieguide.org called the film "wholesome" and "redemptive", praising the film as "a beautifully made movie with a captivating, inspiring story."

References

External links 
 Elijah's Heart, the non-profit organization started by the real Joe Bradford
 

Films about evangelicalism
2012 films
Films set in Tennessee
2010s English-language films